
Gmina Wiśniowa is a rural gmina (administrative district) in Myślenice County, Lesser Poland Voivodeship, in southern Poland.

Villages
Gmina Wiśniowa contains the villages and settlements of Glichów, Kobielnik, Lipnik, Poznachowice Dolne, Węglówka, Wierzbanowa and Wiśniowa.

Neighbouring gminas
Gmina Wiśniowa is bordered by the gminas of Dobczyce, Dobra, Jodłownik, Mszana Dolna, Myślenice, Pcim and Raciechowice.

References
 Polish official population figures 2006

Wisniowa
Myślenice County